National Institute of Technology Andhra Pradesh is a public technical university and one of the National Institutes of Technology started by the Government of India and is situated at Tadepalligudem, West Godavari District, Andhra Pradesh State. It is recognised as an Institute of National Importance by the Government of India. NIT Andhra Pradesh was established in Tadepalligudem (TDD), state of Andhra Pradesh.

The campus is located in Tadepalligudem, spread over an area of 178 acres.

History
The West Godavari district is extremely fertile, getting water abundantly throughout the Cotton barrage built on the Godavari River in City of Rajamahendravaram and the district is popularly known as the Granary of India since about 50% of the state's rice production comes from the district. The campus is very well connected such that one of its entrances would be on NH16 and the other side of the campus will be connected into the core town area of Tadepalligudem. The campus is extremely well connected by road Rajamahendravaram-Eluru (NH 216A), by rail Howrah-Chennai main line and by air Rajahmundry Airport is 50 km away respectively. All the factors of the campus enhancing the development of infrastructure and would not take much much time to grow.

Campus
NIT Andhra Pradesh started its academic & administrative activities from permanent campus from 1 January 2020. There is no transit or temporary campus.

The campus is located at Tadepalligudem town of West Godavari district in Andhra Pradesh with an area of 176 acres. Around Rs. 400 crore has been granted by Government of India for the establishment of campus. CPWD took up the activity of construction of Academic, Hostel, Guest House and Admin buildings in Phase-I and completed few of the them. NIT Tadepalligudem started its full operation at permanent campus from 1 January 2020. The location of NIT campus is the old airport area along with already existing airstrip. The antique airstrip is serving as 2 km, 8 line CC road passing in the campus, and any other campus in India possess such a wide CC road inside campus.
The campus is extremely well connected by road Rajamahendravaram – Eluru (NH 216A), by rail Howrah-Chennai main line and by air Rajahmundry Airport is 50 km away respectively.

Organisation and administration

Governance

NIT Tadepalligudem shares a common Visitor (a position held by the President of India) who is the most powerful person in the NIT organizational structure and the NIT Council with the other sister NITs.

The board of governors consists of members nominated by NIT Council, the director, representatives from Department of Higher Education, Ministry of Human Resource and Development, Government of India.

The institute's director, serves as the chief academic and executive officer of the institute. Under the director the deans, heads of departments, registrar.

The registrar is the chief administrative officer and oversees day-to-day operations. He is the custodian of records, funds, and other properties of the institute.

Under the charge of the heads of departments (HODs) are the faculty (full-time professors as well as those of associate and assistant status). The wardens of hostels are placed under the chief warden.

Financing
Annually, the institute receives fund  from the Government of India.
Alumni and other bodies also donate to contribute to development in the institute. Financial management is undertaken by Financial Committee of the institute.

Academic policies
The academic policies of the institute are decided by its senate. It consists of deans of the institute, all the professors, the director, educationists and specialists. The senate controls and approves the curriculum, courses, examinations and results and appoints committees to look into academic matters. The teaching, training and research activities of the institute are reviewed by the senate to maintain educational standards. The director serves as the ex-officio and chairman of the senate.

Academics

Undergraduate

B.Tech
The Bachelor of Technology(B.Tech.) admissions for Indian students are based on JEE Mains exam and ranks will be given on the basis of score obtained. The B.Tech. admissions for foreign students are taken through DASA and SII scheme.

Specialisations that has been introduced by NIT Andhra are:
 Biotechnology
 Chemical Engineering
 Civil Engineering
 Computer Science and Engineering
 Electrical Engineering
 Electronics and Communication Engineering
 Mechanical Engineering
 Metallurgical and Materials Engineering
 School of Sciences
 School of Humanities & Management

Postgraduate
M.Tech. program is based on the merit of the engineering aptitude test i.e. GATE. The specialisations are:

 Geotechnical Engineering
 Computer Science and Data Analytics
 Advanced Communication Systems and Signal Processing
 Power Electronics and Drive
 Manufacturing Engineering and Thermal Engineering
 Bioprocess Engineering 
 Chemical Engineering

The Bioprocess and Chemical Engineering specialisations have been introduced later.

Ph.D.
NIT Andhra Pradesh introduced Ph.D. programme in full-time and part-time basis across all the existing departments and Schools of the institute.

M.S (By Research)

NIT Andhra Pradesh introduced M.S by research in all the engineering departments in externally sponsored mode.

Student life

Hostel and Mess
NIT Andhra has seven boys' and five girls' hostels with an accommodation capacity of about 2,000 students. The first years have a four-seater room, second and third years have two seater and fourth years have single seater rooms. The hostels have wi-fi, a common area, and sports facilities.There are one mess for Girls hostel and two messes for boys’ hostels to cater the food and other eatables.

Library 
There is a central Library for the students. It contains all the course books as well as E-resources.

Dispensary 
The health center is located with in the campus and the institute has a one full time medical officer and five other paramedical staff to attend the medical needs of the students, staffs and their family members.

Ranking 

NIT Andhra was declared as an Institutes of National Importance by the Government of India in 2015. Since it is the youngest NIT among the chain of NITs, it has not been ranked by the National Institutional Ranking Framework yet. The institute has been awarded and recognised as the Best Institute in South India 2021 by the Centre for Education Growth and Research during the 15th Rashtriya Shiksha Gaurav Puraskar Ceremony.

See also 
 National Institutes of Technology
 National Institute of Technology Warangal
 List of universities in India
 Universities and colleges in India
 Education in India
 Institutes of National Importance

External links

References

Science and technology in Andhra Pradesh
2015 establishments in Andhra Pradesh
Universities and colleges in West Godavari district
Educational institutions established in 2015